Arethas of Caesarea (born c. 860 AD) was Archbishop of Caesarea Mazaca in Cappadocia (modern Kayseri, Turkey) early in the 10th century, and is considered one of the most scholarly theologians of the Greek Orthodox Church.  The codices produced by him, containing his commentaries are credited with preserving many ancient texts, including those of Plato and Marcus Aurelius' "Meditations".

Life
He was born at Patrae (modern-day Greece). He was a disciple of Photius. He studied at the University of Constantinople.  He became Deacon of Patrea around 900 and was made Archbishop of Caesarea by Nikolas of Constantinople in 903.  He was deeply involved in court politics and was a principal actor in the controversy over the scandal created when Emperor Leo VI attempted to marry a fourth time after his first three wives had died and left him without an heir.  Despite Arethas' fame as a scholar, Jenkins thinks little of him as a person.  When recounting the details of the scandal, Arethas is described as "...narrow-minded, bad-hearted... morbidly ambitious and absolutely unscrupulous..."

Works

He is the compiler of a Greek commentary (scholia) on the Apocalypse, for which he made considerable use of the similar work of his predecessor, Andrew of Caesarea. Albert Ehrhard inclines to the opinion that he wrote other scriptural commentaries. To his interest in the earliest Christian literature, caught perhaps from the above-named Andrew, we owe the Arethas Codex, through which the texts of almost all of the ante-Nicene Greek Christian apologists have, in a great measure, reached us. This manuscript was copied by several Italian scribes in the 11th to 14th centuries and eventually taken to Paris, probably acquired in the time of François I. It was assigned number 2271 in the inventory of 1682 and Parisinus graecus 451 in the current numbering.  It was first printed in Verona in 1532 as an appendix to the Pseudo-Oecumenian catena. The Stromata manuscript in Florence is also believed to derive from Arethas.

He is also known as a commentator of Plato and Lucian; the famous manuscript of Plato (Codex Oxoniensis Clarkianus 39), taken from Patmos to London, was copied by order of Arethas. Other important Greek manuscripts, e.g. of Euclid, the rhetor Aristides, and perhaps of Dio Chrysostom, are owed to him. Karl Krumbacher emphasizes his fondness for ancient classical Greek literature and the original sources of Christian theology.

Arethas' works also contain the oldest known references to the Meditations (written c. 175 AD) by the Roman emperor Marcus Aurelius.  Arethas admits to holding the work in high regard in letters to the Byzantine emperor Leo VI the Wise and in his comments to Lucian and Dio Chrysostom'. Arethas is credited with reintroducing the Meditations to public discourse.

Up through the 19th century, scholars believed there to be an earlier Arethas, also an archbishop of Caesarea, who had authored the works on the Apocalypse, around the year 540. Modern scholars believe this to be incorrect, and there to have been only one Arethas.

Notes

References

External links

Opera Omnia by Migne Patrologia Graeca with analytical indexes

860s births
930s deaths
Year of birth uncertain
Year of death uncertain
9th-century Byzantine people
10th-century Byzantine bishops
10th-century Byzantine writers
9th-century Greek people
10th-century Greek people
9th-century Greek philosophers
10th-century Greek philosophers
10th-century Christian theologians
Writers from Patras
Byzantine theologians